The Prestige is the seventh album by Danish death metal band Illdisposed.

Track listing
 "Let Go" – 1:08
 "The Tension" – 3:53
 "Weak Is Your God" – 3:48
 "Working Class Zero" – 3:41
 "A Song of Myself" – 3:33
 "Like Cancer" – 3:46
 "Love Is Tasted Bitter" – 3:33
 "She Knows" – 3:12
 "A Child Is Missing" – 3:28
 "The Key to My Salvation" – 3:15
 "... Your Devoted Slave" – 3:30
 "Ich Bin Verloren in Berlin" – 3:34
 "Purity of Sadness" – 3:27*
 "Now We're History" – 5:03*
 "I Believe In Me" – 5:36*

 *Live songs only available on the limited edition of The Prestige

Personnel
 Bo Summer - vocals
 Jakob Batten - guitar
 Franz Hellboss - guitar
 Jonas Kloge - bass
 Thomas Jensen - drums
All Lyrics written by Bo Summer
All Music written by Jakob "Batten" Hansen

Trivia
In April 2008, Illdisposed announced through their MySpace blog that all royalties for the song "Like Cancer" had been donated to The Danish Cancer Society.

References 

Illdisposed albums
2008 albums
AFM Records albums